Acuff is an unincorporated farming community in northeastern Lubbock County, Texas, United States. It is part of the Lubbock Metropolitan Statistical Area.

History
The town is named for Michael S. Acuff, who arrived in the area in 1891. Acuff's first school was constructed in 1902 and the town had a post office from 1903 to 1912. In 1942, the Acuff school consolidated with, and is currently served by, the Roosevelt Independent School District. During the 1940s Baptists and Methodists shared the same church and the population swelled from (no figures available) to 50 people in the 1950s. The current estimated population is 30.

The Maines family, of which Lloyd Maines and his daughter Natalie Maines are most notable, has its roots in the Acuff area. Hispanic journalist Bidal Aguero was born in Acuff in 1949.

The main crop in the area is cotton. The early settlers cleared the land from prairie grass and mesquite trees using plows pulled by mules. Most of the current landowners are the children and grandchildren of the original settlers.

See also
Dixie Chicks
Llano Estacado
Caprock Escarpment

References

External links

Unincorporated communities in Texas
Unincorporated communities in Lubbock County, Texas
Lubbock metropolitan area
1891 establishments in Texas